William Albert Egerton Bragg (5 August 1896 – 20 January 1970) was an Australian rules footballer who played for the St Kilda Football Club in the Victorian Football League (VFL).

Notes

External links 

1896 births
1970 deaths
Australian rules footballers from Melbourne
St Kilda Football Club players
Australian military personnel of World War I
People from Dandenong, Victoria
Military personnel from Melbourne